Alimov-Lyubimovsky is a rural locality (a khutor) in Panfilovskoye Rural Settlement, Novoanninsky District, Volgograd Oblast, Russia. The population was 150 as of 2010. There are 2 streets.

Geography 
Alimov-Lyubimovsky is located in forest steppe on the Khopyorsko-Buzulukskaya Plain, on the bank of the Kumylga River, 39 km south of Novoanninsky (the district's administrative centre) by road. Sharashensky is the nearest rural locality.

References 

Rural localities in Novoanninsky District